The Elgin Military Museum is a privately-owned, not-for-profit local museum in St. Thomas, Ontario, Canada. Founded in 1982 to preserve and commemorate the contributions of Elgin County to broader Canadian military history, the Museum includes exhibits on the War of 1812, the First World War, the Cold War and the War in Afghanistan.

History
The Elgin Military Museum was established by veterans in 1982 to recognize the contributions of Elgin County to Canadian military history.

The museum recounts the stories of Elgin County residents (long or short term) from the War of 1812 to Afghanistan. Exhibits include models made by craftsmen and a collection of some 600 UN and NATO badges. Exhibits are not confined to the interior as the museum has two M113 armored personnel carriers on permanent display outside.

The Elgin Military Museum also has space dedicated to an elephant, Jumbo, the largest elephant ever held in captivity, died in St. Thomas, Ontario on September 15, 1885. In 1985, in commemoration of the 100th anniversary of his death, a life-size monument named "Jumbo the Elephant (Bronnum)" was installed outside roughly 100 yards up the road from the museum. Finding a home for the monument had been a significant problem until several members of the museum board (who served on the Jumbo Monument Committee) convinced other members of the board to permit the statue to be placed in the parking lot of the museum built on Talbot Street. This was the beginning of the menagerie, which also included kangaroo and dolphins.

HMCS Ojibwa

In 2012, The Elgin Military Museum acquired a former Oberon-class submarine, HMCS Ojibwa S72 At 90 meters in length and 15 meters high, she is the largest artifact in the collection. As the city of St. Thomas is landlocked, ex-Ojibwa is located in Port Burwell, Ontario on Lake Erie. The submarine left Halifax, Nova Scotia in May 2012, arriving at Port Burwell in November that year with public tours beginning in the summer of 2013. The Elgin Military Museum was the recipient of both the provincial and national tourism awards for the tours at ex-Ojibwa after its first year of operation.

Vimy Ridge and The Vimy Poppy

A prominent artifact at the Elgin Military Museum is the Vimy Poppy, which was picked by a soldier from St. Thomas on Vimy Ridge a few weeks after the battle began on April 9 1917, in memory of his fallen comrades. One of these soldiers was Lance Corporal Ellis Sifton who won the Victoria Cross that day but lost his life. The tiny box in which his effects were posted to his parents form part of a display in his honor.

Photos

See also
Base Borden Military Museum
Maritime Museum of the Atlantic
Military history of Canada
National Air Force Museum of Canada
Organization of Military Museums of Canada
The Military Museums,
The Queen's Own Cameron Highlanders of Canada Museum
Virtual Museum of Canada

Affiliations
The museum is affiliated with: CMA,  CHIN, OMMC and Virtual Museum of Canada.

References

External links

The Elgin Military Museum official website
Virtual Museum of Canada Elgin Military Museum website
Project Ojibwa

Military and war museums in Canada
History museums in Ontario
Buildings and structures in St. Thomas, Ontario
Museums in Elgin County